Neo-Dada was an art movement. The term may also refer to:
 Neo-Dada Organizers, a Japanese art collective
 Neo Dada (album), 2009 album by Jono El Grande